Kirk Crater is the unofficial name given to a small crater on Pluto's largest moon Charon. The crater was discovered by the New Horizons space probe in 2015 during its flyby of Pluto and its moons. It was named after the character James T. Kirk from the Star Trek media franchise. The crater is located in the southern hemisphere, just south of the equator, and just east of the prime meridian, near Clarke Montes, in a region that astronomers have named Vulcan Planum.

The floor of Kirk Crater is covered with small mounds called hummocks, which may provide evidence for how ice flowed.

See also
 List of geological features on Charon

References

Impact craters on Charon
New Horizons
Star Trek